Adam Pavlásek (born 8 October 1994) is a Czech tennis player who playing mostly on the ATP Challenger Tour. He reached his career-high ATP singles ranking of World No. 72 in January 2017 and doubles ranking of World No. 94 in October 2022.

Professional career
At the start of 2015, Pavlásek replaced injured countryman Radek Štěpánek in the Hopman Cup, playing alongside Lucie Šafářová. He made a name for himself by defeating world number 20 Fabio Fognini of Italy, Pavlásek's first ever win over a top 20 player.

Pavlásek made his Grand Slam debut at the 2016 French Open as lucky loser. He made his ATP World Tour debut at 2016 Generali Open Kitzbühel, defeating Máximo González and Marcel Granollers to make his first ATP-level quarterfinal, where he lost to Nikoloz Basilashvili.

Junior career
Pavlásek made semifinals at 2012 Australian Open and 2012 French Open and quarterfinal at 2011 US Open in singles.

He also made two grandslam finals at 2012 Australian Open and 2012 French Open in doubles.

As a junior, Pavlásek posted a 72–40 win–loss record in singles, 66–36 in doubles and reached the no. 7 combined world ranking in 2012.

Challenger and Futures finals

Singles: 16 (10–6)

Doubles: 21 (7–14)

References

External links
 
 

1994 births
Living people
Czech male tennis players
People from Bílovec
Hopman Cup competitors
Sportspeople from the Moravian-Silesian Region